El Hispano is a Spanish language newspaper serving Southeastern Pennsylvania. It was established in 1976 and is published weekly on Thursdays.

El Hispano serves Greater Philadelphia, as well as Allentown, PA, Reading, PA, Camden, NJ, and Trenton, NJ, all of which have large Hispanic populations.

See also
Media in Philadelphia
Media in the Lehigh Valley
List of Spanish-language newspapers published in the United States

References

External links
Official Site

Spanish-language newspapers published in the United States
Newspapers published in Pennsylvania